Nil-Saint-Vincent-Saint-Martin is a Belgian village and district of the municipality of Walhain, Wallonia in the province of Walloon Brabant.

The villages of Nil-Saint-Vincent and Nil-Saint-Martin were merged in 1812. 'Nil' is the name of a small river, along whose valley the various areas of settlement (Nil-Pierreux, Nil-Saint-Vincent, Nil-Saint-Martin) lie.

Landmarks
Nil-Saint-Vincent-Saint-Martin has several notable landmarks.

The Tiège windmill
The Tiège windmill was built in 1834 by the Thienpont family. It was used until 23 June 1946 and today is a listed building (monument classé).

The centre of Belgium
The Institut Géographique National, the Belgian national cartographical service, calculated that the geographical centre of Belgium lay in Nil-Saint-Vincent.
The architect Bernard Defrenne built a monument for this location, which was inaugurated on 22 August 1998.
It is located at coordinates .

References

External links
 

Former municipalities of Walloon Brabant
Walhain
Geographical centres